Book of Dowth is the tenth studio album by the German melodic death metal band Suidakra. It was released in 2011 on AFM Records.

Track listing
 "Over Nine Waves" - 01:57
 "Dowth 2059" - 04:38
 "Battle-Cairns" - 03:36
 "Biróg's Oath" - 04:18
 "Mag Mell" - 03:19
 "The Dark Mound" - 05:14
 "Balor" - 04:41
 "Stone of the Seven Suns" - 05:01
 "Fury Fomoraigh" - 05:42
 "Otherworlds Collide" - 01:42
 "Rise of Taliesin" - 06:07 (classically re-arranged)*
 "When Eternity Echoes" - 02:50 (classically re-arranged)*
 "The Fall of Tara" - 04:22 (classically re-arranged)*
 "Marooned" - 05:59 (Running Wild cover)*
 11-14 are Japanese edition bonus tracks

Personnel
 Arkadius Antonik - vocals, guitars, keyboards
 Marcus Riewaldt - bass
 Lars Wehner - drums, backing vocals

Additional personnel
 Axel Römer - bagpipes
 Tina Stabel - female vocals
 Matthias Zimmer - vocals
 Sebastian Hintz - acoustic guitar
 Kris Verwimp - artwork, lyrics
 Martin Buchwalter - producer

External links
 Allmusic
 Album lyrics on suidakra.com

Suidakra albums
2011 albums
AFM Records albums